I Wanna Die in Los Angeles is the second EP by punk rock band Dead to Me. It was released in October 2016 by Fat Wreck Chords and is their first release following 2011's Moscow Penny Ante.

Track listing 
 I Wanna Die in Los Angeles – 02:22
 Tune it Out – 02:06
 Comforting the Disturbed and Disturbing the Comfortable – 04:26

References 

2016 EPs
Dead to Me albums
Fat Wreck Chords EPs